Bunker Hill is an unincorporated community in Cowlitz County, Washington, USA. Bunker Hill is located northwest of the city of Longview, reached by traveling westbound out of the city along Washington State Route 4, also known as Ocean Beach Highway, and turning north onto Bunker Hill Road. The Bunker Hill community is part of the Longview School District, a K-12 school district of about 6,600 students.

Geography
Bunker Hill is located at  (46.2023325, -123.1387306).

References

External links
Longview Public Schools website

Unincorporated communities in Cowlitz County, Washington
Unincorporated communities in Washington (state)